Qualification for 2015 Korea Open Super Series will be held on 15 September 2015.

Men's Single

Seeds

Qualifying draw

First qualifier

Second qualifier

Third qualifier

Fourth qualifier

Women's Single

Seeds

Qualifying draw

First qualifier

Second qualifier

Third qualifier

Fourth qualifier

Men's doubles

Seeds

Qualifying draw

First qualifier

Second qualifier

Third qualifier

Fourth qualifier

Women's doubles

No qualifying draw

Mixed doubles

Seeds

Qualifying draw

First qualifier

Second qualifier

Third qualifier

Fourth qualifier

References
Original Draw Results (25 August 2015)

2015 BWF Super Series
Korea Open Super Series